R. Roberts may refer to:

 R. Roberts (Lancashire cricketer), English cricketer
 R. Roberts (Surrey Club cricketer), English cricketer